Dr Ann Elizabeth Clark (1844–1925) . , which included Dr Sophia L. Jex-Blake, Isabel Thorne, Edith Pechey, Matilda Chaplin, Helen Evans and later Mary Anderson and Emily Bovell.

Life 
Clark was fifth of the 12 children of Eleanor and James Clark of Street, Somerset. She travelled to the University of Bern with Jex-Blake and Pechey to study medicine. Her graduation thesis was titled The Ankle Joint in Man. She was licensed in medicine and midwifery by the Royal College of Physicians of Ireland on 27 May 1878.

Committed to a career in medicine, Clark settled in Birmingham dedicating time to clinical work. She worked in the fields of gynaecology and anaesthesiology and became the assistant to Lawson Tait. She was entrusted with the care of Dr Jex-Blake in her later years, travelling from Birmingham to administer a treatment of anaesthetic.

Writings

References

1844 births
British women activists
English women medical doctors
19th-century British medical doctors
British expatriates in Switzerland
People from Somerset
1925 deaths
University of Bern alumni
19th-century women physicians
19th-century English women
19th-century English people